Dennis “Denny” Wojtanowski is co-founder of the Columbus, Ohio-based nonprofit organization Democratic Voices.

Political Experience

In 2013, Denny started Democratic Voices with long-time colleague and friend, Jeff Rechenbach. The goal is to support the Ohio Democratic Party by awakening others who share the values that we hold.

In 2012, Denny was instrumental to the re-election of U.S. Senator Sherrod Brown. He served as the campaign's Senior Political Adviser.

Denny is passionate about matters of social justice and fundamental fairness. He believes strongly in the ability of a people, working together with open minds and kind hearts, to find workable solutions to today's most pressing socio-political problems.

Denny served as the Executive Assistant for Legislative Affairs in the administration of former Governor Dick Celeste.

Denny was previously a Democratic State Representative for Ohio House District 74 representing parts of Lake and Geauga counties where he was elected for 4 terms and served from 1975 to 1981.

Business career

From 2004 to 2011, Denny was Co-Owner and Managing Member for W&W Swinson, LLC, a real estate development company.

In 2009, Denny served as the President of the Ohio Auto Industry Support Council established by former Governor Ted Strickland. As president, he led the efforts to stabilize and strengthen Ohio's auto sector.

He was Chairman and CEO of the Success Group in Columbus, Ohio from 1984 to 2003. Selective clients included ATT, the Cleveland Browns, Medical Mutual of Ohio, the Cleveland Museum of Art, Buckeye State Sheriffs Association, the Girl Scouts of Ohio, the Cincinnati Convention and Visitor's Bureau and selective pro bono clients, the Coalition of Homeless in Ohio (COHIO) and United Cerebral Palsy of Greater Cleveland and

Philanthropic work/Awards

In 2006, Denny was awarded an honorary Doctor of Laws (LL.D.) by the National University, distinguished by “his outstanding contributions to the state and the country.”

Denny has served on a number of boards and foundations, including the Ohio Arts Council, Progress Ohio, the government affairs steering committee of the Columbus Chamber of Commerce, the visiting committee of the College of Urban Affairs at Cleveland State University, Chair of board-level Committee on Diversity at Medical Mutual of Ohio. He has also served as a national board member of the Camphill Foundation.

References

Democratic Party members of the Ohio House of Representatives
Living people
Cleveland State University people
1950 births